Thomaz Bellucci was the defending champion, however he lost to Marco Chiudinelli in the first round.
Nicolás Almagro won in the final 7–5, 6–1, against Richard Gasquet.

Seeds

Draw

Finals

Top half

Bottom half

References
Main draw
Qualifying singles

Singles